Gurban was the self-declared Shah of Shirvan after the downfall of Mehrab of Shirvan.

Life 
He was chosen by rebel leaders as the next pretender. His exact relationship to the former shahs is unknown, but he is believed to be member of dynasty of Shirvanshahs. He rebelled in Boyuk Zira but was killed by Abdulla Khan Ustajlu.

References

Sources 
 

Year of birth unknown
16th-century Iranian people